The Eastern Army Group of the Ottoman Empire (Turkish: Şark Ordular Grubu or Şark Orduları Grubu) was one of the army groups of the Ottoman Army. It was formed during World War I.

World War I

Order of Battle, June 1918 
In June 1918, the army group was structured as follows:

Eastern Army Group (Ferik Vehip Pasha)
Third Army, (Ferik Mehmed Esad Psaha)
VI Corps (Mirliva Hilmi Pasha)
3rd Caucasian Division (Kaymakam Edib Bey)
36th Caucasian Division (Kaymakam Hamdi Bey)
5th Caucasian Division (Miralay Mürsel Bey)
37th Caucasian Division (Miralay Köprülü Kâzım Bey)
Rumeli Detachment
Ninth Army, (Mirliva Yakub Shevki Pasha)
I Caucasian Corps (Mirliva Kâzım Karabekir Pasha)
9th Caucasian Division, 10th Caucasian Division, 15th Division
IV Corps (Mirliva Ali Ihsan Pasha)
5th Division, 11th Division, 12th Division
Independent Cavalry Brigade

Order of Battle, September 1918 
In September 1918, the army group was structured as follows:

Eastern Army Group (Ferik Halil Pasha)
Third Army, (Ferik Mehmed Esad Pasha)
3rd Caucasian Division, 10th Caucasian Division, 36th Caucasian Division
Ninth Army, (Mirliva Yakub Shevki Pasha)
9th Caucasian Division, 11th Caucasian Division, 12th Division, Independent Cavalry Brigade
Army Of Islam (Mirliva ve Fahri Ferik Nuri Pasha)
5th Caucasian Division, 15th Division

After Mudros

Order of Battle, November 1918 
In November 1918, the army group was structured as follows:

Ninth Army, (Mirliva Yakub Shevki Pasha)
3rd Caucasian Division (Ahıska)
9th Caucasian Division (south of Erzincan)
10th Caucasian Division (Batum - moving to Constantinople)
11th Caucasian Division (Hoy)
36th Caucasian Division (from Third Army, Gümrü)
12th Division (Serdarabad)
Independent Cavalry Brigade
Army Of Islam (to October 27, 1918)
5th Caucasian Infantry Division (Bakü)
15th Division (North Caucasus)

Sources

External links

Army groups of the Ottoman Empire
Military units and formations of the Ottoman Empire in World War I